SS C. Francis Jenkins was a Liberty ship built in the United States during World War II. She was named after C. Francis Jenkins, a pioneer of early cinema and television.

Construction 
C. Francis Jenkins was laid down on 20 July 1944, under a Maritime Commission (MARCOM) contract, MC hull 2316, by J.A. Jones Construction, Panama City, Florida; sponsored by Mrs. E. S. Gladys Morgan, wife of resident MARCOM auditor; and launched on 26 August 1944.

History
She was allocated to Agwilines Inc., 9 September 1944. On 22 May 1946, she was laid up in the National Defense Reserve Fleet, Hudson River Reserve Fleet, Jones Point, New York.

Allocated to A. L. Burbank and Co., LTD, 16 July 1946. Placed in National Defense Reserve Fleet, Mobile, Alabama, 2 December 1946.

She was sold, on 16 December 1946, to Cia de Nav. Cristobal, for commercial use, and renamed Ionian Leader. She was withdrawn from the fleet on 12 January 1947.

References

Bibliography 

 
 
 
 

 

Liberty ships
Ships built in Panama City, Florida
1944 ships
Hudson River Reserve Fleet
Mobile Reserve Fleet